Sesan is a commune in Ou Ya Dav District in northeast Cambodia. It contains three villages and has a population of 921.  In the 2007 commune council elections, all five seats went to members of the Cambodian People's Party. The land alienation rates in Sesan was moderate as of January 2006. (See Ratanakiri Province for background information on land alienation.)

References

Communes of Ratanakiri province